Seedorf Castle (also called Turmmatt Castle) is a medieval castle ruin in the municipality of Seedorf in the canton of Uri in Switzerland.  It is near the school complex of Seedorf and across the street from the newer castle of Apro.

See also
List of castles and fortresses in Switzerland

References

External links
 Swiss Castles]

Castles in the canton of Uri
Cultural property of national significance in the canton of Uri
Ruined castles in Switzerland